İsmail Kartal (born 15 June 1961), colloquially known by the given nickname "Arap İsmail", is a Turkish football manager, and former footballer who represented the Turkey national football team.

Career
Born in Istanbul, Turkey, Kartal played 11 seasons in the Turkish Süper Lig. He won two national league titles with Fenerbahce SK in 1984–85 and 1988–89 seasons. He played for Denizlispor and Adanaspor at the end of his football player career.
Kartal made six appearances for the senior Turkey national football team from 1982 through 1985.

Managerial career
After his retirement he started his management career and coached Karabükspor, Sivasspor, Mardinspor, Altay, Malatyaspor, Orduspor and Konya Anadolu Selçukspor. He led Sivasspor to win TFF First League title for the first time in club's history. Between 1997 and 1999 and 2010 to 2014, he was the assistant coach at Fenerbahce SK. After Ersun Yanal's resignation, Kartal took over as manager of the club.
At the end of the 2014–15 Süper Lig season, he officially announced his resignation as manager of Fenerbahçe, though it was clear beforehand that he would not be manager for the next season. He led Ankaragücü to win TFF First League title in 2018.

Managerial statistics

Honours

As a player
Sarıyer
TFF First League: 1981-82
Fenerbahçe
Süper Lig: 1984-85, 1988-89
Turkish Super Cup: 1984, 1985, 1990
Prime Minister's Cup: 1989

As an assistant manager
Fenerbahçe
Süper Lig: 2010-11, 2013-14
Turkish Cup: 2011-12, 2012-13

As a manager
Sivasspor
TFF First League: 2004–05
Fenerbahçe
Turkish Super Cup: 2014

References

External links
 todayszaman.com
 İsmail Kartal at Mackolik
 

 

1961 births
Living people
Association football fullbacks
Turkish footballers
Turkey international footballers
Sarıyer S.K. footballers
Gaziantepspor footballers
Fenerbahçe S.K. footballers
Denizlispor footballers
Adanaspor footballers
Fenerbahçe football managers
Eskişehirspor managers
Turkish football managers
Konyaspor managers